Michael Grimm is the major-label debut album, and third overall, by America's Got Talent season five winner, Michael Grimm.

Background
A week after winning Talent, Michael was signed to Epic Records. Michael collaborated with Ann Wilson on the opening track, "Gasoline and Matches," and he collaborated with Travis Tritt on the Lynyrd Skynyrd remake, "Simple Man." The album was produced by Don Was.

Singles
Michael performed the song "Fallin'" by Alicia Keys on The Ellen DeGeneres Show to promote the album on March 24, 2011. He also announced the album's release date during the show.

Reception
The album debuted at #13 on the US Billboard 200 chart, selling 22,000 copies.

Track listing
The track list according to Amazon.com and Allmusic.

Personnel
Michael Grimm - guitar, acoustic guitar, lead vocals
Waddy Wachtel - guitar, electric guitar 
Patrick Warren - keyboards
Reggie McBride, Davey Faragher - bass
Ian McLagan - Hammond B3, piano, Wurlitzer
Greg Leisz - dobro, guitar, electric guitar, pedal steel, slide guitar, mandolin
Kenny Aronoff - drums, percussion
Daphne Chen - violin
Lauren Chipman - viola
Richard Dodd - cello
Julia Waters, Julie Waters, Maxine Waters - backing vocals

Credits
Producer - Don Was
Production coordinator - Ivy Skoff 
Engineer - Howard Willing 
Second engineers - Phil Allen, Scott Moore		
Mixing - Bob Clearmountain	
Mixing assistant - Brandon Duncan		
Vocal engineer - Thom "TK" Kidd		
Mastering - Bob Ludwig		
Photography - Dove Shore		
Art direction, design - Fusako Chubachi

References

2011 albums
Epic Records albums
Sony Records albums